The sixth season of NCIS: New Orleans an American police procedural drama television series, originally aired on CBS from September 24, 2019 through April 19, 2020. The season was produced by CBS Television Studios, with Christopher Silber and Jan Nash as showrunner and executive producer.

Cast and characters

Main
 Scott Bakula as Dwayne Cassius Pride, NCIS Southeast Field Office Special Agent in Charge (SAC), later Supervisory Special Agent (SSA) and Team Leader
 Lucas Black as Christopher LaSalle, NCIS Senior Field Agent (SFA)
 Vanessa Ferlito as Tammy Gregorio, NCIS Special Agent
 Necar Zadegan as Hannah Khoury, NCIS Senior Agent, Team Leader demoted to second in command
 Rob Kerkovich as Sebastian Lund, NCIS Special Agent (SA) and Forensics Specialist
 Daryl "Chill" Mitchell as Patton Plame, NCIS Computer Specialist
 CCH Pounder as Loretta Wade, Jefferson Parish Medical Examiner
 Charles Michael Davis as Quentin Carter, NCIS Special Agent

Recurring
 Chelsea Field as Rita Devereaux, Dwayne's girlfriend
 Shanley Caswell as Laurel Pride, Dwayne's daughter by his ex-wife, Linda Pride
 Derek Webster as Raymond Isler, FBI Senior Special Agent
 Jason Alan Carvell as Jimmy Boyd, Dwayne's younger, previously unknown half-brother
 Richard Thomas as NCIS Deputy Director Ezra Van Cleef
 Hal Ozsan as Ryan Porter
 Lenny Platt as Detective David Cabrera
 Amanda Warren as Mayor Zahra Taylor
 Keith David as Gene Holloway
 Joanna Cassidy as Mena Cantrell
 Venus Ariel as Naomi Porter
 Cory Hart as D.I.A. Agent Winchester

Guest
 Eddie Cahill as Eddie Barrett
 Rebecca Luker as Rose LaSalle
 Lucy Faust as Sue-Ann Hughes
 Angel Desai as Dr. Beth Tanaka
 Callie Thorne as Sasha Broussard
 Paige Turco as Linda Pride
 Cooper Jack Rubin as Tom
 Arielle Bianca as Neighbor #10
Cast notes

Episodes

Production

Development
NCIS: New Orleans was renewed for a sixth season on April 22, 2019. In March 2020, CBS announced that the filming of this season has been delayed the production following the COVID-19 pandemic. On May 6, 2020, NCIS: New Orleans was renewed for the seventh season.

Casting
Lucas Black left the series during the sixth season. NCIS: New Orleans showrunners said "We are sad to see him go, but happy he will have more time to spend with his family." Black last appeared in the sixth episode "Matthew 5:9". On February 5, 2020, it was announced that Charles Michael Davis had been cast as Quentin Carter, and would appear as a series regular.

Broadcast
The sixth season of NCIS: New Orleans premiered on September 24, 2019.

Reception

Ratings

Home media

References

External links
 
 

06
2019 American television seasons
2020 American television seasons
Television productions suspended due to the COVID-19 pandemic